Charles Towry-Law may refer to:

 Charles Towry-Law, 3rd Baron Ellenborough (1820–1890), member of the House of Lords
 Charles Towry-Law, 4th Baron Ellenborough (1856–1902), member of the House of Lords